Daleville is an unincorporated community along Mississippi Highway 39 in North Lauderdale County, Mississippi, United States. It has a post office with the ZIP code 39326.

The settlement is named for Samuel Dale, Lauderdale County's first representative in the Mississippi Legislature.

History
The original US land grant for a large portion of Daleville was granted to John A. McKellar on February 27, 1841.  US Land Grant Certificate 29376.  This grant included Lots 2, 7, 8, 9, and 10, of Section 5, Township 8 North, Range 16 East in the District of Sands.  John A. McKellar lived in Perry County, Alabama, USA at the time of the grant.

Government

State
The Mississippi Senate district map divides Daleville into two sections. The area north of Hickory Grove Road is in the 32nd State Senate District which seats Sampson Jackson, II (D). The balance of the community resides in the 31st State Senate District which seats Terry Burton (R).

The Mississippi House of Representatives also divides Daleville into two districts. House District 42 is represented by Reecy Dickson (D). House District 81 is represented by Steven A. Horne (R).

Federal
The city is located in Mississippi's 3rd congressional district, represented by Gregg Harper (R), who has been in office since 2009.

Infrastructure

Highways
 Mississippi Highway 39

Notable people
 Jewell Jeannette Glass, mineralogist and geosciences educator
 William Glenn Terrell, former member of the Florida House of Representatives and the Florida Senate and justice of the Florida Supreme Court from 1923 to 1964

References 

Unincorporated communities in Mississippi
Unincorporated communities in Lauderdale County, Mississippi